Parada e Failde is a civil parish in the municipality of Bragança, Portugal. It was formed in 2013 by the merger of the former parishes Parada and Failde. The population in 2011 was 657, in an area of 52.13 km².

References

Parishes of Bragança, Portugal